Darband-e Sofla (also Romanized as Darband-e Soflá; also known as Āq Darband) is a village in Marzdaran Rural District, Marzdaran District, Sarakhs County, Razavi Khorasan Province, Iran. At the 2006 census, its population was 58, in 18 families.

References 

Populated places in Sarakhs County